Su Yuanjie (born 14 April 1995) is a Chinese footballer who currently plays for Tianjin TEDA in the Chinese Super League.

Club career
Su Yuanjie started his professional football career in 2015 when he joined China League One side Tianjin Songjiang. On 14 March 2015, he made his senior debut in a 2–0 away loss against Beijing Enterprises, coming on for Liu Qing in the 56th minute. On 12 July 2015, Su scored his first senior goal in a 3–1 home victory over Wuhan Zall. He scored his second goal of the season on 25 July 2015 in a 2–0 away win over Qingdao Jonoon. Su became a substitute player in the 2016 season after Quanjian Nature Medicine took over the club. He made three league appearances as Tianjin Quanjian won the title and promoted to the Chinese Super League. He made his Super League debut on 4 March 2017 in a 2–0 away loss to Guangzhou R&F, coming on for Zhao Xuri in the 80th minute. On 20 May 2018, Su scored his first goal in the Super League and assisted Alexandre Pato's winning goal in a 2–1 home win against Shanghai Greenland Shenhua.

Su transferred back to fellow Super League side Tianjin TEDA in February 2019. He would make his debut on 30 April 2019 in a Chinese FA Cup game against Zibo Cuju F.C. in a 4-1 victory.

Career statistics
.

Honours

Club
Tianjin Quanjian F.C.
China League One: 2016

References

External links
 

1995 births
Living people
Chinese footballers
Sportspeople from Jinan
Footballers from Shandong
Tianjin Tianhai F.C. players
Tianjin Jinmen Tiger F.C. players
Chinese Super League players
China League One players
Association football midfielders